"Hong Kong Blues" is a popular song composed by American songwriter Hoagy Carmichael in 1939. It was featured in the 1944 film To Have and Have Not, an adaptation of Ernest Hemingway's novel by the same name.

Former Beatle George Harrison covered the tune on his 1981 album Somewhere in England. Also, the Quebecer Dédé Fortin presented his cover of "Hong Kong Blues" with Les Colocs on their album Atrocetomique. Martin Denny covered it on his 1957 album Exotica. Japanese musician Haruomi Hosono, who was influenced by Denny to found the Yellow Magic Orchestra, covered the song on his 1976 album Bon Voyage co., as well as on two live albums, Harry Hosono and Tin Pan Alley in Chinatown, recorded in Yokohama the same year, and America, recorded in Los Angeles in 2019.

References

Song recordings produced by George Harrison
George Harrison songs
Songs with music by Hoagy Carmichael
1944 songs
Songs with lyrics by Paul Francis Webster